Highway 264 is a highway in the Canadian province of Saskatchewan. It runs from Highway 2 to Highway 263 in the Prince Albert National Park at Waskesiu Lake.

About half of Highway 264 lies within the Prince Albert National Park. The section outside of it connects with an access road to McPhee Lake. The 2011 Official Highway Map of Saskatchewan shows the highway passing a community by the name of Elk Ridge just outside the park boundaries.

References

264